A galvanostat (also known as amperostat) is a control and measuring device capable of keeping the current through an electrolytic cell in coulometric titrations constant, disregarding changes in the load itself.

Its main feature is its nearly "infinite" (i.e. extremely high in respect to common loads) internal resistance.

The designation "galvanostat" is mainly used in electrochemistry: this device differs from common constant current sources by its ability to supply and measure a wide range of  currents (from picoamperes to amperes) of both polarities.

The galvanostat responds to changes in the resistance of the cell by varying its output potential: as Ohm's law shows, 
 
the variable system resistance and the controlled voltage are directly proportional, i.e.

where 
 is the electric current that is kept constant
 is the output control voltage of the amperostat
 is the electrical resistance that varies;
thus, an increase of the load resistance implies an increase of the voltage the amperostat applies to the load.

Technical realization 

The simpler galvanostat consists of a high-voltage source producing a constant voltage  with a resistor  connected in series: in order to force an almost constant current through a load, this resistor shall be much higher than the load resistor . As a matter of fact, the current  through the load is given by

This simple realization requires rather high voltages (~100 V) to keep the load current constant with sufficient approximation for all practical purposes. Therefore, more complex versions of galvanostats, using electronic amplifiers with feedback and lower voltages, have been developed and produced. These instruments are capable to feed constant currents in the ranges from few picoamperes (pA) to several amperes (A); typical construction for use in the lower range of feed currents uses operational amplifiers.

Example of application 

Galvanostatic deposition techniques can be used for some thin film deposition applications where there is no need to control morphology of the thin film.

See also 
Current source
Potentiostat

External links 

Pierre R. Roberge (Webmaster) "Galvanostat", corrosion-doctors.org Electrochemistry Dictionary.

Electroanalytical chemistry devices